Fernando Yunes Márquez (born 10 February 1982) is a Mexican politician affiliated with the PAN. He currently serves as Senator of the LXII Legislature of the Mexican Congress representing Veracruz.

References

1982 births
Living people
Politicians from Veracruz
Members of the Senate of the Republic (Mexico)
National Action Party (Mexico) politicians
21st-century Mexican politicians
Senators of the LXII and LXIII Legislatures of Mexico